Fortune Everett Gordien (September 9, 1922 – April 10, 1990) was an American discus thrower and shot putter who set four world records in the discus throw. He competed in this event at the 1948, 1952 and 1956 Olympics and placed third, fourth and second, respectively. At the 1955 Pan American Games he won a gold medal in the discus and a silver in the shot put.

Domestically Gordien won six AAU and three NCAA titles. According to the Guinness Book of Track and Field: Facts and Feats, the smallest crowd ever to see a world record may have been 48, the number attending a Pasadena, California all-comers track meet in 1953 when Gordien set his last world record that stood for six years.

Gordien attended the University of Minnesota. His coach there, Jim Kelly, also became coach of the U.S. track-and-field team for the 1956 Summer Olympics, where Gordien won a silver medal.

In the 1950s, Gordien had a few minor roles in films and TV series, including The Cisco Kid (1950), The Egyptian (1954), Not for Hire (1959) and North to Alaska (1960).

Gordien was a coach at San Bernardino Valley College.

Masters

July 1968 Gordien competed in the first Masters National Outdoor Track and Field Championship held in San Diego, winning the DT.  June 1970 Gordien (47) set the Masters M45 record in the discus at 167'-8".    April 1973 Gordien (50) once again set a Masters Record in the discus at 177'-9" (Mt Sac Relays). and

References

External links 
 

1922 births
1990 deaths
American male discus throwers
American male shot putters
Olympic silver medalists for the United States in track and field
Olympic bronze medalists for the United States in track and field
Athletes (track and field) at the 1948 Summer Olympics
Athletes (track and field) at the 1952 Summer Olympics
Athletes (track and field) at the 1955 Pan American Games
Athletes (track and field) at the 1956 Summer Olympics
Pan American Games gold medalists for the United States
Pan American Games silver medalists for the United States
Pan American Games medalists in athletics (track and field)
World record setters in athletics (track and field)
Track and field athletes from Washington (state)
Sportspeople from Spokane, Washington
American male film actors
American male television actors
Male actors from Washington (state)
Medalists at the 1956 Summer Olympics
Medalists at the 1948 Summer Olympics
Minnesota Golden Gophers men's track and field athletes
20th-century American male actors
Medalists at the 1955 Pan American Games